Corey Phelps is an American business educator and author. He currently serves as the Dean of the Michael F. Price College of Business at the University of Oklahoma and a professor of strategy and entrepreneurship.

Career
Prior to his current position, Phelps served as Associate Dean of Executive Programs and Education, Professor of Strategy and Organization, and the Marcel Desautels Faculty Fellow at the Desautels Faculty of Management at McGill University.

He has also served as a member of the Strategy and Business Policy faculty at HEC Paris and was an Assistant Professor of Management and Organization along with serving as the Dempsey Faculty Fellow at the Foster School of Business at the University of Washington.

Phelps is the co-author, with Bernard Garrette and Olivier Sibony, of Cracked It! How to Solve Big Problems and Sell Solutions Like Top Strategy Consultants and has written articles for various publications and scholarly journals. Phelps has received multiple research awards and grants and is a past member of the editorial boards of four leading academic journals.

Phelps is the past Chair of the Academy of Management Technology and Innovation Management Division along with the Knowledge and Innovation Interest Group of the Strategic Management Society. In 2011, he co-founded the European Strategy, Entrepreneurship and Innovation (SEI) Doctoral Consortium.

He is the past director of the HEC Paris-Atos GOLD Talent Development Program, an  EFMD Excellence in Practice Award recipient.

For his teaching, he was awarded the Pierre Vernimmen BNP Paribas Award at HEC Paris and two professor of the year awards at the University of Washington.

Publications
Phelps’s research has been published in academic journals including the Academy of Management Journal, Information Systems Research,  Management Science,  Organization Science, and Strategic Management Journal. According to Google Scholar, Phelps’s research has received over 8,500 citations as of 2022.

Phelps received the Academy of Management Technology and Innovation Management Division’s Best Dissertation Award, The State Farm Companies Foundation Dissertation Award, and the 2012 INFORMS Technology Management Best Paper Award.

According to research conducted by the  Meta-Research Innovation Center at Stanford University, Phelps is among the world's top 2% most-cited economics and business researchers.

Background
Phelps earned an undergraduate degree and MBA from San Diego State University. He received a Ph.D. from the Stern School of Business at New York University.

References

External links
 

Living people
American business executives
American academics
Year of birth missing (living people)
Academic staff of HEC Paris
University of Oklahoma faculty